The Chief of Staff is the professional head of the Armed Forces of the Republic of Liberia. The Chief of Staff is appointed by the President of Liberia, who is the commander-in-chief of the Armed Forces according to the Constitution.

The current Chief of Staff is Major General Prince C. Johnson III, since 6 February 2018.

List of officeholders

Liberia Frontier Force

Armed Forces of Liberia

Deputy Chiefs of Staff
Colonel Daniel Moore (-11 February 2013)
Colonel Eric Wayma Dennis (11 February 2013-8 August 2016) 
Brigadier General Prince Charles Johnson III (14 November 2016-6 February 2018)
Brigadier General Geraldine George (since 6 February 2018)

References 

Chief of Staff
Liberia